Following is a list of teams that will participate in the 2012–13 World Curling Tour.

Men
As of December 9, 2012

Women
As of December 14, 2012

References
World Curling Tour: Women's teams
World Curling Tour: Men's teams

External links
World Curling Tour: Home

Teams
2012 in curling
2013 in curling
World Curling Tour teams